Potato Hill may refer to several places:

Potato Hill (Latah County, Idaho), an elevation in Latah County, Idaho
Potato Hill (New York), an elevation in Oneida County, New York
Potato Hill, a scene of fighting during the 1864 Battle of Byram's Ford